Volkswagen has marketed estate/station wagon variants of its Golf model since its third generation in 1993, through its current eight generation.

Volkswagen marketed the station wagon as Jetta Sportwagen and later the Golf Sportwagen in the United States, the Bora Sportwagen in Mexico, Golf Break and later Golf SW in France, Jetta Variant in Brazil, Vento Variant in Argentina, Jetta Wagon in Canada (only for 2009), Golf Wagon in Canada (onwards from 2010), Golf Estate in the United Kingdom and prominently as the Golf Variant in the domestic market in Germany and most other markets.



Golf Mk3 Estate (1993–1999)

The Volkswagen Golf Mk3 Estate were introduced in September 1993, and were succeeded in March 1999 by the Volkswagen Golf Mk4 Estate and Bora Estate. There was no estate model based on the Mk1 and Mk2 Golfs.

EnginesVolkswagen Golf Mk3 owner's manual, January 1997 
The engines used are the same as for many other Volkswagen Group cars:

[1] Also available as Syncro with four-wheel drive.

Golf Mk4 Estate (1999–2006)

The Volkswagen Golf Mk4 Estate was introduced in April 1999. It was discontinued in December 2006, and succeeded in March 2007 by the Volkswagen Golf Mk5 Estate. Unlike the Mk3, it was offered in North America where the Jetta name, tail lights, and front sheetmetal were used. Using the Volkswagen Group A4 (PQ34) platform, in many European markets both Bora Variant (with Jetta front) and Golf Variant (with Golf front) were sold until 2004 and 2006, respectively.

EnginesVolkswagen Golf Mk4 technical data, May 2001 
The engines used are the same as for many other Volkswagen Group cars:

[1] Also available as 4motion with four wheel drive.

Golf Mk5 Estate (2007–2009)

2007–2009 
The Volkswagen Golf Mk5 Estate was introduced in April 2007 and produced up to April 2009. The vehicle is larger and based on the Volkswagen Group A5 (PQ35) platform shared with the Volkswagen Jetta Mk5, Škoda Octavia, SEAT Toledo, SEAT León and Audi A3.

The Golf Mk5 Estate was replaced in May 2009 by the Golf Mk6 Estate, which is built on the same platform.

Golf Mk6 Estate (2009–2013)

VW introduced a facelifted Estate (MK6) in May 2009, essentially an updated fifth generation estate with front fascia and interior styling mirroring the sixth generation Golf. There was a "Golf Estate Concept R" showcar unveiled at the 2013 Geneva Motor Show.

Golf Mk7 Estate (2013–2020)

Released in August 2013, the fifth edition of the Golf Estate was derived from the Volkswagen Golf Mk7 and based on the MQB platform.

Unlike its predecessor, the Mark 6, which was a facelifted fifth generation estate, the Mark 7 was a new design. It was also called the Golf GTS in the domestic market in the Philippines.

Golf Mk8 Estate (2020–)

A new Variant based on the Golf Mk8 was unveiled in September 2020. Sales in the US are not planned. Production is now back in Wolfsburg. The Golf Mk8 variant is based on an all-new MQB Evo platform shared with the Audi A3, SEAT León and Škoda Octavia.

See also
 Wolfsburg Volkswagen Plant

References

External links
VW Golf Sportwagen(USA)

Golf Estate
Station wagons
Front-wheel-drive vehicles
All-wheel-drive vehicles
Cars introduced in 1993
2000s cars
2010s cars
Cars powered by VR engines